This is a list of films which placed number-one at the weekly box office in Australia during 1997. Amounts are in Australian dollars.

Highest-grossing films

See also
 List of Australian films - Australian films by year

References

1997
Australia
1997 in Australian cinema